Larry Howard Shue (July 23, 1946 – September 23, 1985) was an American playwright and actor, best known for writing two oft-performed farces, The Nerd and The Foreigner.

Early life
Shue was born in New Orleans, Louisiana, and grew up in Kansas and Glen Ellyn, Illinois. He graduated cum laude from Illinois Wesleyan University, where he received a Bachelor of Fine Arts. He served in the United States Army at Fort Lee, Virginia from 1968 to 1972. He then began his career as a professional actor and playwright with the Harlequin Dinner Theatre in both Washington, D.C. and Atlanta. He worked in repertory theater and on the New York stage, and appeared in television's One Life to Live. Film appearances include the shorts A Common Confusion; Another Town; and The Land of the Blind: or The Hungry Leaves; and the feature-length Sweet Liberty.

As a member of Milwaukee Repertory Theater, Shue played the sailor Joe in the 1980 premiere of Lakeboat by David Mamet.  Mamet dedicated the play to Shue and the production's director, John Dillon.

Shue married Linda Faye Wilson in 1968; they were divorced in 1977.

Career
Shue's two best-known plays were written and first performed while he was playwright-in-residence at the Milwaukee Repertory Theater:
The Nerd premiered in April 1981, and was produced successfully in London's West End. It transferred to Broadway in 1987. It is a simple character-based comedy, in which a normal dinner party, interrupted by the house-guest from hell, dissolves into insanity.
The Foreigner premiered in 1983, and transferred to Off-Broadway. The central character is Charlie Baker, who, while on a vacation in a Georgia hunting lodge, pretends not to be able to understand English, so as to avoid the attentions of the other guests. His plan backfires and he soon finds himself the confidant of everyone there, especially a young man named Ellard, who thinks he is teaching Charlie English. Charlie ends up having to foil the schemes of the local Ku Klux Klan chapter without revealing his secret.

His other plays include:
Grandma Duck Is Dead – about antics in a college dormitory
My Emperor's New Clothes – "set in the kingdom of Mango-Chutney, a one-act children's musical based on the Hans Christian Andersen story (Shue works in some cross-dressing, as well as a rhyme for "orange")"
Wenceslas Square – set in 1974 Prague after the Soviet invasion of 1968

The off-Broadway production of The Foreigner resulted in two Obie awards in 1985, to Jerry Zaks for direction and Anthony Heald for performance. From the Outer Critics Circle, it received the John Gassner Playwriting Award and the award for Best Off Broadway Play.

Death
Shue's success was short-lived. At the age of 39, he died in the crash of a Beech 99 commuter plane en route to Shenandoah Valley Regional Airport near Weyers Cave, Virginia; all fourteen people on the flight were killed, twelve passengers and two crew. At the time, Shue was preparing for his first big Broadway role, as Reverend Crisparkle in Joseph Papp's The Mystery of Edwin Drood.

Among many other eulogies, author Thomas M. Disch said that Shue's death was "fate's cruelest trick on the theater since the murder of Joe Orton." Also in remembrance, Canadian actor, Jeff Brooks, said, "I knew him, and I saw him play Charlie [in the play The Foreigner] in New York. Then I played it in New York after him, although we're quite different as actors." Shue played the smaller role of Froggy, and Brooks had something to say about that, as well: "I know damn well he wrote Charlie for himself. As an actor, he was such a cut-up. When I saw him, he was wonderful. I remember thinking a couple of times that he's doing things that if he were the playwright sitting out here, he'd be saying, 'Oh, stop that. Cut that out.' But he was having so much fun inventively in the role."

References

External links

1946 births
1985 deaths
Illinois Wesleyan University alumni
Accidental deaths in Virginia
Writers from New Orleans
People from Glen Ellyn, Illinois
Male actors from New Orleans
20th-century American male actors
20th-century American dramatists and playwrights
American male stage actors
American male film actors
United States Army soldiers
Victims of aviation accidents or incidents in 1985
Victims of aviation accidents or incidents in the United States